Only 16 is the debut album by Terry Black and was released in 1965.

The album featured five songs that were released as singles: "Unless You Care" which reached #2 in Canada, "Poor Little Fool", which reached #6, "Little Liar", which reached #10, "Only Sixteen", which reached #14, and "Say It Again", which reached #24.

Track listing
All songs written and composed by P.F. Sloan and Steve Barri except where noted.
 "Only Sixteen" (Sam Cooke) – 2:13
 "Can't We Go Somewhere" – 1:59
 "Little Liar" – 2:15
 "Ordinary Girl" – 2:20
 "World Without Love" (Lennon–McCartney) – 2:45
 "Unless You Care" – 2:01
 "Poor Little Fool" (Sharon Sheeley) – 2:10
 "Bad to Me" (Lennon–McCartney) – 2:12
 "Say It Again" – 2:10
 "How Many Guys" – 2:17
 "Everyone Can Tell" – 2:08
 "Kisses for My Baby" – 2:19

Credits
Produced by: Sloan and Barri (2-6, 8-12), Adler (1, 7)

Charts
Singles

References

1965 debut albums
Albums produced by P. F. Sloan
Albums produced by Steve Barri
Albums produced by Lou Adler